The 1944–45 season was Port Vale's second season of football in the wartime league system of World War II. First-team football was reinstated at the Old Recreation Ground for the first time since the 1939–40 season, however success was limited as they finished in the lower reaches of the North Championship and the League North Cup.

Overview
Port Vale resumed first-team football for the first time since the 1939–40 season, entering the North Championship of the war league, which contained 54 teams but required only 18 games to be played by each club. The junior team had been active since this time and the club hoped they could step up to perform at a senior level, supplemented by guest players. A good crowd of 8,768 turned up at the Old Recreation Ground for the season-opener to Birmingham, and a 3–0 victory offered hope of a successful season. However they lost the reverse fixture 4–0 and went on to pick up only one more point by the end of September. Their home performances were generally competent, but they ended the league with only one point on the road. Vale ended the league programme in 46th-place, having accrued just 12 points from their 18 games.

A ten game series for qualification to the League North Cup began in December and the club appointed David Pratt to manage the players, succeeding director Jack Diffin, though Pratt failed to gain clearance from the Royal Air Force and so never actually took charge of a game. Vale managed to win 3–2 away at Chester on 6 January, but lost six games of the series, including heavy 8–1 and 6–2 defeats to Potteries derby rivals Stoke City. A seven games series of the North Championship followed, which attracted little interest as crowds dwindled. Though Vale managed to beat Stockport County 5–0, they lost five of their seven games, including two further poor defeats at the hands of Stoke City. The season concluded with four games of Midland Cup competition, of which Vale lost three. The opening game of the competition did though see a 3–2 win over Walsall; the Vale line-up included a 16-year old Ronnie Allen and renowned Ireland international Peter Doherty. The club made a profit of £1,262 on the season, thanks to gate receipts of £11,200.

Results
Port Vale's score comes first

Legend

North First Championship

League table

Matches

League North Cup

League table

Matches

North Second Championship

Midland Cup

League table

Matches

Player statistics

Appearances

Top scorers

Transfers

Transfers in

Transfers out

References
Specific

General

Port Vale F.C. seasons
Port Vale